Victoria Sanz Moreno is a Spanish scientist. She is professor of cancer cell biology at Queen Mary University of London.

Early life 
Sanz-Moreno was born in London, England to an analytical chemist father and English teacher mother. Following completion of her father's postdoctoral studies her family moved back to Spain.

Sanz-Moreno studied chemistry and biochemistry at the University of Oviedo in Spain, receiving her masters in biochemistry. She obtained her PhD in chemical sciences in Piero Crespo's laboratory at the University of Cantabria.

Career 
After completing a short postdoc at the University of Cantabria, Sanz-Moreno was a CRUK and Marie Curie Intra-European Fellow at the Institute of Cancer Research in London.  Sanz-Moreno received a CRUK Career Development Fellowship in 2011 and founded an independent research group in the Randall Division of Cell and Molecular Biophysics at King's College London. In 2017 Sanz-Moreno received a CRUK Senior Fellowship. In 2018 she was recruited to Barts Cancer Institute as professor of cancer cell biology. 

In 2014, Sanz-Moreno joined Cancer Research UK's Women of Influence initiative helping provide personal and career development support for female cancer research scientists.

Recognition 
In 2008, Sanz-Moreno received the Applied Biosystems and EACR 40th Anniversary Research Award.
Sanz-Moreno was shortlisted for the CRUK Communications and Brand Ambassador Prize (2015).
In 2017, Sanz-Moreno received the 2017 BSCB Women in Cell Biology Early Career Medal.
In 2019, Vicky received Distinguished Alumnus Award given by Colegio Inmaculada (Asturias)
In 2021 she was elected to be a part of the Phone App “La Ruta de las Cientificas” together with other 8 female scientists. 
https://apps.apple.com/us/app/ruta-de-las-cient%C3%ADficas/id1571468626
In 2022, she received  the VP Award for Research Excellence from QMUL Faculty of Medicine and Dentistry.
In 2022, she also received the Estela Medrano Memorial Award from the Society for Melanoma Research (SMR).
https://www.bartscancer.london/grants-awards/2022/10/professor-victoria-sanz-moreno-recognised-for-major-contributions-in-the-fight-against-melanoma/

References 

Year of birth missing (living people)
Living people
University of Oviedo alumni
University of Cantabria alumni
Academics of Queen Mary University of London